Batan or Batán may refer to:

Places and locations 
 Batan, Aklan, a municipality in the Philippines
 Batan Island, the main island of the province of Batanes, the Philippines
 Batan Island, Albay, in Rapu-rapu, Albay, the Philippines
 Batan, Binhai County (八滩镇), town in Binhai County, Jiangsu, China
 Batán, Costa Rica, a town in Costa Rica
 Batán River, a river of northern Colombia
 Batán Zoo, a zoo in Batán, Buenos Aires Province, Argentina
 Batán, Argentina, a city in Buenos Aires Province, Argentina
 Batán (Madrid Metro), a station on the Madrid Metro

Other uses 
 Batan (stone), a.k.a. batán – a kitchen utensil used for grinding in Andean cuisine
 Batani tribal confederacy in Afghanistan, who believe they all have descended from a son of Qais Abdur Rashid, the mythical ancestor of all Pashtuns
 Badan Tenaga Nuklir Nasional (BATAN), the National Nuclear Energy Agency of Indonesia

See also 
 Batanes
 Bataan
 Bataan (disambiguation)